The 1923 season was the twelfth season for Santos FC.

References

External links
Official Site 

Santos
1923
1923 in Brazilian football